This is a list of the High Sheriffs of the English county of Nottinghamshire.

The High Sheriff is the oldest secular office under the Crown. Formerly the High Sheriff was the principal law enforcement officer in the county but over the centuries most of the responsibilities associated with the post have been transferred elsewhere or are now defunct, so its functions are now largely ceremonial. The High Sheriff changes every March.

From 1068 until 1567, the position existed as High Sheriff of Nottinghamshire, Derbyshire and the Royal Forests. From 1568 separate appointments were made for the High Sheriff of Nottinghamshire and for the High Sheriff of Derbyshire.

16th century
 For Sheriffs prior to 1568 see High Sheriff of Nottinghamshire, Derbyshire and the Royal Forests
 1567: Sir Anthony Strelley
 1568: Thomas Cowper
 1569: John Byron
 1570: John Nevill
 1571: Robert Markham
 1572: Sir Gervase Clifton (4th term)
 1573: William Holles of Haughton
 1574: Sir Thomas Stanhope of Shelford
 1575: Henry Pierrepont of Holme Pierrepont
 1576: George Chaworth of Wiverton
 1577: Thomas Markham of Ollerton
 1578: John Biron of Newstead Abbey
 1579: Sir Francis Willoughby of Wollaton Hall (1st term)
 1580: George Nevill
 1581: William Sutton of Arundel
 1582: Francis Molyneux of Teversal Manor
 1583: Robert Markham
 1584: Brian Lassels
 1585: John Sydenham
 1586: George Chaworth
 1587: Sir Thomas Stanhope of Shelford
 1588: Sir Francis Willoughby of Wollaton Hall (2nd term)
 1589: John Byron
 1590: Thomas Thornhough
 1591: John Holles, 1st Earl of Clare of Haughton
 1592: John Basset
 1593: Sir Francis Willoughby of Wollaton Hall (3rd term)
 1594: William Sutton
 1595: Richard Whalley of Kirton and Screveton
 1596: John Biron of Newstead Abbey
 1597: John Thorold
 1598: Henry Chaworth
 1599: Brian Lassels

17th century

18th century

19th century

20th century

21st century

See also
 Sheriff of Nottingham
 Sheriff of Nottingham (position)

References

 
Local government in Nottinghamshire
Nottinghamshire
High Sheriff of Nottinghamshire